Pyramid Peak is a  summit in the Cascade Mountains of Washington State, near Naches Pass on the King-Kittitas county line. The peak is near the Pacific Crest Trail and can be reached via a branch trail. It once had a series of fire lookouts beginning in 1923, the last of which was destroyed  the early 1960s.

The height is 5,715 feet on some maps.

References

External links

Mountains of King County, Washington
Cascade Range
Mountains of Washington (state)